Gasterellopsis is a fungal genus in the family Agaricaceae. This is a monotypic genus, containing the single species Gasterellopsis silvicola, originally found in East Lansing, Michigan. It is named for its similarity to the genus Gasterella.

See also
 List of Agaricales genera
 List of Agaricaceae genera

References

Agaricaceae
Fungi of the United States
Monotypic Agaricales genera